Seán Coen (born 1941) is an Irish retired Gaelic footballer who played for club side St. Vincent's and at inter-county level with the Dublin senior football team.

Career

A member of the St. Vincent's club, Coen first came to prominence on the inter-county scene with the Dublin minor team that won the All-Ireland Championship in 19589 hen Cavan were beaten in the final. He immediately progressed onto the county junior team that won the All-Ireland Junior Championship title in 1960. After joining the Dublin senior team, Coen won Leinster Championship medals in 1962 and 1963, however, the highlight of his inter-county career was being selected as a substitute for the 1963 All-Ireland final defeat of Galway.

Honours

Dublin
All-Ireland Senior Football Championship: 1963
Leinster Senior Football Championship: 1962, 1963
All-Ireland Junior Football Championship: 1960
Leinster Junior Football Championship: 1960
All-Ireland Minor Football Championship: 1959
Leinster Minor Football Championship: 1959

References

1941 births
Living people
St Vincents (Dublin) Gaelic footballers
Dublin inter-county Gaelic footballers